The Flag of UNESCO (United Nations Educational, Scientific and Cultural Organization) is one of the official symbols of the institution. The format consists of the white organization emblem on a blue background. The colors blue and white are the official colors of the United Nations.

The logo of the organization consists of the text UNESCO in white sans-serif fonts, each of which forms a column of a portico of old architectural construction in stylized design. The vintage temple symbolizes one of its main goals that is the accomplishment of cultural activities for the preservation of the world cultural and historical patrimony. The temple is also formed by a pediment and a staircase with three steps.

References 

UNESCO
Flags of international organizations